The Collection (UK, Germany, Spain) and All That She Wants (Denmark) are Ace of Base compilation albums.

Track listing
 "All That She Wants"
 "Voulez-Vous Danser"
 "Young and Proud"
 "Waiting for Magic"
 "Happy Nation"
 "Dancer in a Daydream"
 "Edge of Heaven"
 "Angel Eyes"
 "Beautiful Life"
 "My Déjà Vu" (German album version)
 "Lucky Love"
 "Never Gonna Say I'm Sorry"
 "Travel to Romantis"
 "Cecilia"
 "Cruel Summer" (Big bonus mix)
 "Tokyo Girl (Ace of Base song)"
 "Donnie"
 "Everytime It Rains"

References

Ace of Base compilation albums
2002 greatest hits albums